Ezequiel Echeverría (born 12 March 1985 in Buenos Aires, Argentina) is an Argentine football manager and former player. He is currently manager of Ingeniero White de Banderaló. He played in the second tiers of Argentina, Venezuela and Chile. He started out his professional career in the Primera B Nacional for Ferro Carril Oeste before moving to Central Italo in the Venezuelan Segunda División. In 2010, Echeverría played briefly for Naval in the Primera B de Chile.

Teams
  Ferro Carril Oeste 2004–2007
  Centro Italo 2007–2008
  Naval 2010
  FC Tres Algarrobos 2013–2015

References

1985 births
Living people
Argentine footballers
Argentine expatriate footballers
Ferro Carril Oeste footballers
Naval de Talcahuano footballers
Primera B de Chile players
Expatriate footballers in Chile
Expatriate footballers in Venezuela
Association football midfielders
Footballers from Buenos Aires